Sonic's Ultimate Genesis Collection (Sega Mega Drive Ultimate Collection in PAL regions) is a compilation of video games developed by Backbone Entertainment and published by Sega for PlayStation 3 and Xbox 360. The compilation features 48 Sega games (49 counting two versions of Altered Beast) which were previously released for the Sega Genesis (including most of the Sonic the Hedgehog titles released for the system), arcades and the Master System. It is the sequel to the Sega Genesis Collection released previously for the PlayStation 2 and PlayStation Portable, but contains 16 (in NTSC regions) more games (including unlockable extras).

List of games

Sega Genesis

Alex Kidd in the Enchanted Castle †
Alien Storm
Altered Beast †
Beyond Oasis
Bonanza Bros. †
Columns †
Comix Zone †
Decap Attack †
Dr. Robotnik's Mean Bean Machine
Dynamite Headdy
Ecco the Dolphin †
Ecco: The Tides of Time †
ESWAT: City Under Siege
Fatal Labyrinth
Flicky †
Gain Ground †
Golden Axe †
Golden Axe II †
Golden Axe III †
Kid Chameleon †
Phantasy Star II †
Phantasy Star III: Generations of Doom †
Phantasy Star IV: The End of the Millennium †
Ristar †
Shining Force
Shining Force II
Shining in the Darkness
Shinobi III: Return of the Ninja Master †
Sonic & Knuckles
Sonic 3D Blast
Sonic Spinball
Sonic the Hedgehog †
Sonic the Hedgehog 2 †
Sonic the Hedgehog 3
Streets of Rage
Streets of Rage 2
Streets of Rage 3
Super Thunder Blade †
Vectorman †
Vectorman 2 †

† Previously available in Sega Genesis Collection.

Unlockable extra games

Alien Syndrome (arcade)
Altered Beast (arcade) †
Congo Bongo (arcade) (under original title Tip Top in some regions) †
Fantasy Zone (arcade)
Golden Axe Warrior (Master System)
Phantasy Star (Master System)
Shinobi (arcade)
Space Harrier (arcade)
Zaxxon (arcade) †

† Previously available in Sega Genesis Collection.

According to Ethan Einhorn, the producer for the collection, the three "lock-on" games (Knuckles in Sonic 2, Sonic 3 & Knuckles, and Blue Sphere) were not included citing "tight development times", and that including them would have meant "dropping several titles from the collection altogether", specifically the aforementioned nine unlockable games since "they all required unique emulation solutions".

Reception

Sonic's Ultimate Genesis Collection received "generally favorable" reviews, according to review aggregator Metacritic.

References

2009 video games
Multiplayer and single-player video games
PlayStation 3 games
Sega Genesis
Sonic the Hedgehog video games
Sega video game compilations
Video games developed in the United States
Xbox 360 games